Joseph Acton (1803 – 8 December 1862) was a British Whig politician.

Acton was first elected Whig MP for Wigan at a by-election in 1854–caused by the death of Ralph Anthony Thicknesse–and held the seat until 1857 when he did not seek re-election.

References

External links
 

Whig (British political party) MPs for English constituencies
UK MPs 1852–1857
1803 births
1862 deaths
Members of the Parliament of the United Kingdom for Wigan